The 2021–22 Creighton Bluejays women's basketball team represents Creighton University in the 2021–22 NCAA Division I women's basketball season. The Bluejays, led by 20th year head coach Jim Flanery, play their home games at D. J. Sokol Arena and are members of the Big East Conference.

Roster

Schedule

|-
!colspan=9 style=|Exhibition

|-
!colspan=9 style=| Regular season

|-
!colspan=9 style=| Big East Tournament

|-
!colspan=9 style=| NCAA Tournament

Rankings

See also
2021–22 Creighton Bluejays men's basketball team

References

Creighton Bluejays women's basketball seasons
Creighton
Creighton
Creighton Bluejays
Creighton Bluejays